The men's individual competition of the Vancouver 2010 Olympics was held at Whistler Olympic Park in Whistler, British Columbia on February 18, 2010.  Two silver medals were awarded for a second-place tie.  No bronze medal was awarded.

Results

See also
Biathlon at the 2010 Winter Paralympics – Men's individual

References

External links 
 2010 Winter Olympics results: Men's 20 km Individual, from https://web.archive.org/web/20091025194336/http://www.vancouver2010.com/; retrieved 2010-02-17.

Individual